Gilbert Hamilton may refer to:

People 

 Gilbert Hamilton (minister) (1715–1772), Scottish minister
 Gilbert Hamilton (1869–1947), Swedish nobleman and soldier
 Gilbert P. Hamilton (1890–1962), American film director
 Gilbert Van Tassel Hamilton (1877–1943), American physician and writer
Gilbert Hamilton of Glenarbuck (1744–1808), Scottish merchant

Other uses 
 Gilbert H. Hamilton House, a historic building in Columbus, Ohio